Russian girl group Serebro has released a total of three studio albums, one EP and 29 singles. Their debut single, "Song #1" reached number 99 in the UK, 68 in Switzerland, 35 in Sweden and 72 in Denmark and became their most commercially successful single. Their next single, "Дыши", was released in 2007. It reached number 2 in Russia, making it their first single to chart there. 
The band's next single "Опиум", which was known as a comeback single, peaking at 1 in Russia, 2 in Moscow, 5 in Latvia and 35 in Ukraine. It became their second number, but through references, it is currently their first. 
The band's fourth single "Скажи, не молчи" became the band's second number 1, but had less success, becoming one of the band's most unsuccessful singles to date, but with good commercial success. While their last single, it became member Marina Lizorkina last single when she left the band.
The band released their debut album ОпиумRoz, released on 25 April 2009 in Russia and 2 March 2010 elsewhere. It was released by Monolit Records and Symbolic Records. Although it did not chart in any major charts, it had success threw online.

After the album was released, the band had announced a line-up change and replaced Lizorkina with new and current member Anastasia Karpova. On 24 August 2009, the band had released their fifth single "Сладко". It became successful in Russia, peaking at number 1 in Russia, and 5 in Latvia. It was marked as another comeback single. After the release, the band's first EP Избранное, released in September 2009.
In April 2010, the band released their sixth single Не Время, which was the band's most recognisable single to date, peaking at number 6 in Russia, the band's first single to peak outside the top 5. The English version was released on September. 
The band's single, Давай держаться за руки was successful in their native Russia, peaking at 3 in Russia, 18 in Ukraine and 7 in Latvia. However, it was the group's single "Mama Lover", which received media attention around Europe, and peaked outside off the Russian Federation, charting in countries including Spain, Czech Republic and Italy. It reached over 20 million views on YouTube, and is known as the group's most successful single to date. Mama Lover, the group's second studio album was released on 19 June 2012.

Studio albums

EPs

Singles

Music videos
 2007: "Song #1" (Eurovision preview version) 
 2007: "Song #1" (Full length clip)
 2007: "Песня #1" (Song #1)
 2007: "Дыши" (Breathe)
 2008: "Опиум" (Opium)
 2008: "Опиум" (Rose version)
 2008: "Скажи, не молчи" (Tell me, not quietly)
 2009: "Сладко" (Sweet)
 2010: "Не Время" (No time)
 2011: "Давай держаться за руки" (Hold my hands)
 2011: "Давай держаться за руки (Dubstep Version)"
 2011: "Mama Lover"
 2011: "Мама Люба" (Mama lover)
 2011: "Мальчик (Promo Video)"
 2012: "Мальчик" (Boy)
 2013: "Angel Kiss (Dubstep Version)"
 2013: "Sexy Ass"
 2013: "Мало тебя" (Little of you)
 2013: "Mi Mi Mi"
 2013: "УГАР" (DJ M.E.G. feat. Serebro) (Waste)
 2014: "Я тебя не отдам" (I won't give you up)
 2014: "Я тебя не отдам (Emo Version)"
 2015: "Kiss" - 3:44
 2015: "Перепутала" (Confused)
 2016: "Отпусти меня" (Let me go)
 2016: "Отпусти меня (МУЗ-ТВ version)"
 2016: "Chocolate"
 2016: "Chocolate (Matvey Emerson Fitness Remix)"
 2016 : "Сломана" (Broken)
 2016 : "My Money"
 2017 : "Пройдет (Mood Video)" (Passing)
 2017 : "Между нами любовь (Summer Fun Video)"
 2017 : "Между нами любовь" (Between us is love)
 2017 : "В космосе" (In space)
 2018 : "Новый год" (New year)
 2018 : "Chico Loco"
 2018 : "Притяженья больше нет" (No more attraction) (with Maxim Fadeev)
 2018 : "Пятница" (Friday)
 2019 : "О, мама" (Oh, mama)

References

External links
Official Website of Serebro

Discography
Discographies of Russian artists
Pop music group discographies